The 2015 Open Bogotá was a professional tennis tournament played on clay courts. It was the tenth edition of the tournament which was part of the 2015 ATP Challenger Tour. It took place in Bogotá, Colombia between 2 and 8 November 2015.

Singles main-draw entrants

Seeds

 1 Rankings are as of October 26, 2015.

Other entrants
The following players received wildcards into the singles main draw:
  Daniel Elahi Galán
  José Olivares
  Riki Oshima
  Cristian Rodríguez

The following player entered the main draw as an alternate:
 

The following players received entry from the qualifying draw:
  Gero Kretschmer
  Felipe Mantilla
  Alejandro Mendoza
  Dean O'Brien

Champions

Men's singles

  Eduardo Struvay def.  Paolo Lorenzi 6–3, 4–6, 6–4

Men's doubles

  Julio Peralta /  Horacio Zeballos def.  Nicolás Barrientos /  Eduardo Struvay 6–3, 6–4

Open Bogota
2015 in Colombian tennis